Charles Sorum (March 11, 1867 – August 18, 1935) was an American gymnast. He competed in four events at the 1904 Summer Olympics.

References

External links
 

1867 births
1935 deaths
American male artistic gymnasts
Olympic gymnasts of the United States
Gymnasts at the 1904 Summer Olympics
Sportspeople from Oslo